Paraschiv Vasilescu (March 14, 1864–1925) was one of the generals of the Romanian Land Forces in the First World War. Between March 3, 1904 and April 1, 1905, Major Vasilescu was the commander of the Border Guard Corps. He served as a division commander in the 1916, 1917, and 1918 campaigns.

Biography
After graduating in 1885 from the military school of officers with the rank of second lieutenant, Vasilescu held various positions in the infantry units or in the upper echelons of the army, the most important being those of commander of the 3rd Infantry Regiment and of the 4th Territorial Corps.

From January 1917 he served as Deputy Chief of the General Headquarters.

He was decorated with the Order of Michael the Brave, class III, for the way he led the 14th Infantry Division in the battles of the 1916 campaign, being one of the first generals decorated with this order (the second decree for generals, together with General Eremia Grigorescu).

After the war, Vasilescu held a number of important positions in the army, such as commander of the Army Corps and Inspector General of the Army.

References

Bibliography
 Kirițescu, Constantin,  History of the war for the unification of Romania, Scientific and Encyclopedic Publishing House, Bucharest, 1989
 Ioanițiu, Alexandru (Lt.-Colonel),  The Romanian War: 1916-1918, vol 1, Genius Printing House, Bucharest, 1929
 Romania in the World War 1916-1919, Documents, Annexes, Volume 1, Official Gazette and State Printing Offices, Bucharest, 1934
 The General Headquarters of the Romanian Army. Documents 1916 - 1920, Machiavelli Publishing House, Bucharest, 1996
 Military history of the Romanian people, vol. V, Military Publishing House, Bucharest, 1989
 Romania in the years of the First World War, Militară Publishing House, Bucharest, 1987
 "Romania in the First World War", Military Publishing House, 1979

1864 births
1925 deaths
Romanian Land Forces generals
Romanian military personnel of the Second Balkan War
Romanian Army World War I generals
Recipients of the Order of Michael the Brave
Officers of the Order of the Crown (Romania)
Officers of the Order of the Star of Romania